Campbell-Rumsey House is a historic home located at Bath in Steuben County, New York.  It was built about 1855 and is a two-story, Italianate style brick residence.  It was home to two prominent Bath residents, Robert Campbell (1808–1870) and David Rumsey (1810–1883).

It was listed on the National Register of Historic Places in 1983.

References

Houses on the National Register of Historic Places in New York (state)
Italianate architecture in New York (state)
Houses completed in 1855
Houses in Steuben County, New York
National Register of Historic Places in Steuben County, New York
1855 establishments in New York (state)